John Nagle House, is located in Closter, Bergen County, New Jersey, United States. The house was built in 1740 and was added to the National Register of Historic Places on January 9, 1983.

See also
National Register of Historic Places listings in Bergen County, New Jersey

References

Closter, New Jersey
Houses on the National Register of Historic Places in New Jersey
Houses completed in 1740
Houses in Bergen County, New Jersey
National Register of Historic Places in Bergen County, New Jersey
New Jersey Register of Historic Places
1740 establishments in New Jersey